Efraín de Jesús Rodríguez is a Puerto Rican politician affiliated with the Popular Democratic Party (PPD). He was elected to the Puerto Rico House of Representatives in 2012 to represent District 19. De Jesús worked as a commissioner for the Mayagüez Municipal police and as Director of contracts of the same municipality. At the island level, he chaired the Association of Municipal Commissioners. Before being elected, he served as Director of legal affairs for the Municipality of Mayagüez, a position he held for the last seven years. He has a Juris Doctor degree he has a master's and doctoral studies in literature and Hispanic studies.

References

External links
Efraín de Jesús Profile on WAPA-TV

Living people
Popular Democratic Party members of the House of Representatives of Puerto Rico
Year of birth missing (living people)